Bogomil Ferfila (born June 7, 1951) is a Slovenian political scientist, economist, and journalist.

Ferfila is founder and head of the American, German and Global Studies graduate program, chair of the "Policy Analysis and Public Administration" and a member of the Centre for Political Science Research at the Faculty of Social Sciences of University of Ljubljana.

He was a Fulbright Scholar (University of Pittsburgh; 1990–91) and Japan Foundation fellow (1998). Beside being a full professor at the University of Ljubljana, he was also visiting professor/scholar at the Cleveland State University (1991), University of Manitoba (1991, 1993, 1998–2014) and also at Washington State University (1998–2014).

Selected bibliography 
 Bogomil Ferfila and Paul Arthur Phillips: Political economy of labor: Canada and Slovenia (Calcutta: Sampark; 2011)
 Bogomil Ferfila and Paul Arthur Phillips: Slovenia's transition: From medieval roots to the European Union (Lanham: Lexington Books; 2010; .)

References 

1951 births
Living people
20th-century Slovenian economists
Academic staff of the University of Ljubljana
University of Ljubljana alumni
21st-century Slovenian economists
Yugoslav economists